Fabrizio Trezzi (born 7 July 1967) is an Italian former cyclist. He competed at the 1988 Summer Olympics and the 1992 Summer Olympics.

References

External links
 

1967 births
Living people
Italian male cyclists
Olympic cyclists of Italy
Cyclists at the 1988 Summer Olympics
Cyclists at the 1992 Summer Olympics
Place of birth missing (living people)
Cyclists from Milan